The People Power Monument is a monument built to commemorate the events of the 1986 People Power Revolution. The monument is located on the corner of Epifanio de los Santos Avenue and White Plains Avenue in Barangay Camp Aguinaldo, Quezon City, Philippines. It was made by Eduardo Castrillo in 1993.

Description
The monument is set atop an elevated position and is pyramidal in composition. The first and middle tiers are composed of statues of people from all sectors of the society. The first tier is composed of a chain of men and women with arms linked together. One man at the end of the chain is pointing towards EDSA Shrine and the Ortigas Area.

The middle tier represents various people, young and old, who had joined the protest; some of the statues are that of a musician, a mother carrying an infant, a man sporting the "Laban" sign, and priests and nuns. On the top tier of the monument is a towering female figure with arms raised toward the sky. The figure have unchained shackles on her wrist which represent freedom. From the back of the composition rises a large flag and staff.

As with any other artistic works in the Philippines, the monument is protected by copyright according to the Intellectual Property Office of the Philippines.

November 2016 protests
In November 2016, the monument became a gathering point where anti-Marcos groups, Martial Law victims and political figures gathered at the monument to denounce the surprise burial of Ferdinand Marcos at the Libingan ng mga Bayani (Hero's Cemetery) that took place on November 18, 2016. Protesters condemned the hero's burial citing wide-scale plunder and human rights abuses during the Marcos dictatorship. Members and former members of the Cabinet were among the protesters.

7 Symbols of Peace nomination
In May 2018, the monument was nominated as one of the seven symbols of world peace through the #7Peace #PeoplePower initiative.

Gallery

See also
 Ferdinand Marcos
 EDSA Revolution of 2001
 EDSA Shrine
 Bantayog ng mga Bayani
 EDSA Tres
 Joseph Estrada
 Gloria Macapagal Arroyo
 People Power Revolution

References

External links
 

Monuments and memorials in Metro Manila
Landmarks in the Philippines
Buildings and structures in Quezon City
Tourist attractions in Quezon City
Sculptures by Filipino artists